Brian Bell (born April 4, 1984) is a former American football fullback and tight end. He is currently the Assistant Strength and Conditioning Coach for the Tennessee Titans. He previously filled this role with the Nittany Lions and the Texans.

College career
While at Kent State, Bell played in 32 games and totaled 60 catches for 654 yards with five touchdowns.

Professional career

Washington Redskins
Bell was signed by the Washington Redskins on May 15, 2007. He was released by the Redskins on October 16, 2007.

Personal life
Brian and his wife, Crystal, have three children.

References

1984 births
Living people
People from Prince George's County, Maryland
American football tight ends
American football fullbacks
Kent State Golden Flashes football players
Washington Redskins players
Players of American football from Maryland
Houston Texans coaches
Tennessee Titans coaches